The Family is a Canadian dramatic television miniseries which aired on CBC Television in 1971.

Premise
This series of four dramas concerned modern families.

Scheduling
This hour-long series was broadcast at 9:00 p.m. from 17 February to 24 March 1971.

 17 February 1971: "The Stranger Was Me" (by Dennis Donovan) featured the life of a boy who lives in a country foster home
 24 February 1971: "You And Me" (by Douglas Bowie) concerned a couple whose lives are pulled in separate directions, a situation which prevents them from having a normal family life
 10 March 1971: "Forever Amok" (by Len Peterson) was a comedy about a man whose children were born by numerous women
 17 March 1971: "Straight And Narrow" (by George Robertson) deals with a father whose traditional values are challenged by his family

References

External links
 

CBC Television original programming
1971 Canadian television series debuts
1971 Canadian television series endings
1970s Canadian drama television series
1970s Canadian television miniseries
Television series about families